Colonel David Haskell Hackworth (November 11, 1930 – May 4, 2005) was a United States Army officer and journalist who was decorated in both the Korean War and Vietnam War. Hackworth is known for his role in the creation and command of Tiger Force, a military unit that was formed in South Vietnam to apply guerrilla warfare tactics against Viet Cong guerrilla fighters.

Hackworth is also known for his accusation in 1996 that Chief of Naval Operations Admiral Michael Boorda was wearing two unauthorized service ribbons on his uniform denoting valor in combat. Although Boorda had served off the Vietnamese coast in the 1960s and believed he was authorized to wear the two wartime decorations for meritorious service, this did not meet the United States Navy's requirements. Boorda committed suicide during Hackworth's investigation. It came out in 1997 that Hackworth claimed he had earned two Distinguished Flying Cross medals (when in fact he had only earned one) and that he was entitled to a Ranger Tab, an insignia worn on the shoulder of the uniform when in fact he was not.

The youngest colonel in Vietnam at the time of his promotion, he was also praised by General Creighton Abrams as "the best battalion commander I ever saw in the United States Army."

Early life
Hackworth was born in Ocean Park, California (now part of Santa Monica), on November 11, 1930, the son of Leroy E. Hackworth and Lorette (Kensly) Hackworth. His parents both died before he was a year old, and his brother, sister, and he was raised by Ida Stedman, their paternal grandmother.

The family had to rely on government aid during the Great Depression, and his grandmother, who had been married to a Colorado gold miner, brought them up on tales of her Old West experiences and her Revolutionary War ancestors. While attending school in Santa Monica, Hackworth and a friend earned money by shining the shoes of soldiers stationed at bases in the area.  Imbued with a sense of adventure, at age 14, Hackworth lied about his age and paid a transient to pose as his father so he could claim to be old enough to join the United States Merchant Marine with parental consent.

Military career
Hackworth served aboard a ship in the South Pacific Ocean as a member of the Merchant Marine in 1945, at the end of World War II.  He returned home to California but decided to join the United States Army, and in 1946, he used his false Merchant Marine documents to enlist for three years. After completing his initial training, he was assigned to post-war occupation duty as a rifleman in the 351st Infantry Regiment, 88th Infantry Division.  Based in Trieste, his unit was part of Trieste United States Troops. While serving in Trieste, Hackworth earned his General Educational Development high-school equivalency diploma.

Korean War
Hackworth fought in the Korean War with the 25th Reconnaissance Company and the 27th Infantry (Wolfhound) Regiment of the 25th Infantry Division. He gained a battlefield commission as a second lieutenant in 1951 and was awarded three Silver Stars for heroism and three Purple Hearts. After a successful raid on Hill 1062 and battlefield promotion to first lieutenant, the commander of the 27th Infantry Regiment offered Hackworth command of a new volunteer raider unit. Hackworth created the 27th Wolfhound Raiders and led them from August to November 1951. He subsequently volunteered for a second tour in Korea, this time with the 40th Infantry Division. Hackworth was promoted to the rank of captain.

Demobilized after the Armistice Agreement in Korea, Hackworth became bored with civilian life after two years of college and re-entered the U.S. Army in 1956 as a captain.

Interwar service

When Hackworth returned to active duty, the expanding Cold War substantially changed the structure of the army from what he had known. Initially posted to 77th Antiaircraft Artillery Battalion in Manhattan Beach, California, Hackworth was eventually assigned to Germany, initially in staff roles, but returning to infantry in the early 1960s as a company commander under Colonel Glover S. Johns. He was involved in a number of fire drills around the Berlin Crisis of 1961. He recounted his experiences with the Soviet guard and his views on military history in his book About Face.

After completing an associate of arts degree at Los Angeles Harbor College, and completing additional courses at several other colleges, in 1964, Hackworth graduated from Austin Peay State University with a Bachelor of Science degree in history, after which he attended the Command and General Staff College.

Vietnam service
When President John F. Kennedy announced that a large advisory team was being sent to South Vietnam, Hackworth immediately volunteered for service. His request was denied, on the grounds that he had too much frontline experience, and that others who had seen less fighting (or none) should have an opportunity to acquire experience in combat.

In 1965, he deployed to Vietnam at the rank of Major, serving as an operations officer and battalion commander in the 101st Airborne Division. In November 1965, Hackworth founded a platoon-sized unit designated as Tiger Force to "out guerrilla the guerrillas".  The unit carried out long-range reconnaissance patrol duties, suffering heavy casualties; it was eventually awarded the Presidential Unit Citation. However, after Hackworth was promoted out of Vietnam, the unit committed a series of war crimes, with U.S. Army investigative records estimating that Tiger Force soldiers killed hundreds of noncombatants. Hackworth later stated in an interview with the Toledo Blade that he was unaware of the war crimes the unit carried out and refused to speculate on why they occurred.

Hackworth quickly developed a reputation as an eccentric but effective soldier, becoming a public figure in several books authored by General S. L. A. "Slam" Marshall. Following a stateside tour at the Pentagon and promotion to lieutenant colonel, Hackworth co-wrote The Vietnam Primer with Marshall after returning to Vietnam in the winter of 1966–67 on an Army-sponsored tour with the famous historian and commentator. The book advised counter-insurgency fighters to adopt some of the guerrilla tactics used by Mao Zedong, Che Guevara, and Ho Chi Minh. Hackworth described the strategy as "out-G-ing the G." His personal and professional relationship with Marshall soured as Hackworth became suspicious of his methods and motivation.

However, both his assignment with "Slam" Marshall and his time on staff duty at the Pentagon soured Hackworth on the Vietnam War. One aspect of the latter required him to publicly defend the U.S. position on the war in a speaking tour. Even with his reservations concerning the conflict, he refused to resign, feeling it was his duty as a field grade officer to wage the campaign as best he could.

Hackworth was assigned to a training battalion at Fort Lewis, Washington, and then returned to Vietnam to lead elements of the 9th Infantry Division, turning his theories about guerrilla warfare and how to counter it into practice with the 4th Battalion, 39th Infantry Regiment (4-39 Infantry) in the Mekong Delta, an underperforming unit made up largely of conscripts which Hackworth transformed into the counter-insurgent "Hardcore" Battalion (Recondo) from January to late May 1969.

Hackworth next served as a senior military adviser to the South Vietnamese. His view that the U.S. Army was not learning from its mistakes, and that South Vietnamese ARVN officers were essentially corrupt and ineffective, created friction with Army leadership.

In early 1971, Hackworth was promoted to the rank of colonel and received orders to attend the Army War College, an indication that he was being groomed for the general officer ranks. He had declined a previous opportunity to go to the War College, and turned down this one, as well, indicating his lack of interest in becoming a general and demonstrating his discontent with the war and the Army's leaders.

Hackworth's dissatisfaction ultimately culminated in a television interview with ABC. On June 27, 1971, he appeared on the program Issues and Answers and strongly criticized U.S. commanders in Vietnam, said the war could not be won and called for U.S. withdrawal. The interview enraged senior U.S. Army officers at the Pentagon.

He subsequently retired as a colonel.  Senior Army leaders investigated Hackworth, who avoided them for several weeks.  He was nearly court-martialed for various allegations during his Vietnam service, such as running a brothel, running gambling houses, and exploiting his position for personal profit by manipulating the scrip in which soldiers were paid and the limited U.S. currency available in the war zone. Ultimately, Secretary of the Army Robert Froehlke opted not to press charges, deciding that Hackworth's career accomplishments outweighed his supposed misdeeds and that prosecuting an outspoken war hero would result in unneeded bad publicity for the Army.

Business activity
After leaving the Army, Hackworth settled on the Australian Gold Coast near Brisbane. He soon made a fortune through profitable ventures that included real estate investing, a duck farm, and a popular restaurant called Scaramouche. He was also active in the Australian antinuclear movement.

Writing career
Hackworth returned to the U.S. in the mid-1980s and began working as a contributing editor on defense issues for Newsweek. He also made regular television appearances to discuss various military-related topics, and the shortcomings of the military. His commentary on the psychological effects of post-traumatic stress disorder, based on his own experiences in overcoming it, resonated with disabled veterans.

In the mid-1990s, Hackworth investigated Admiral Jeremy Michael Boorda, then Chief of Naval Operations. Hackworth, through his Newsweek articles, questioned Boorda's longtime wearing of two bronze "valor pins"  (in the Navy, the "V" device was worn on certain decorations to denote valor in combat or direct combat participation with the enemy) on his Navy Commendation Medal and Navy Achievement Medal service ribbons, generating much controversy. Boorda committed suicide before he could be interviewed by Hackworth, who had received at least one Army Commendation Medal and other decorations with the "V" device from the U.S. Army in the Vietnam War (in the Army, the "V" device denoted valor in combat only). The Navy reviewed the matter and determined afterwards that the two "Combat Distinguishing Devices" (Combat "V"'s) that Boorda had worn on two of his uniform service ribbons since the Vietnam War and until almost a year before Hackworth's and Newsweek's intervention, were both unauthorized despite the fact Boorda and some others serving on Boorda's destroyer had been given verbal authorization for the devices by Admiral Elmo Zumwalt during the war.

Hackworth's last assignment in a combat/conflict zone was with Newsweek during the initial deployment of US forces into Bosnia and Herzegovina in February 1996. Hackworth joined 3-5 CAV of the 1st Brigade, 1st Armored Division near the disputed village of Brcko. Hackworth interviewed a number of officers and enlisted soldiers, reinforcing his historical tenure as a seasoned combat veteran of previous wars and as a well-known and respected journalist.

Hackworth appeared on countless television and radio talk shows and formed his own website, Soldiers for the Truth, continuing to be the self-proclaimed voice of the "grunts" (ground troops) until his death.

King Features Syndicate distributed Hackworth's weekly column "Defending America". Many of his columns discussed the War on Terrorism and the Iraq War and were concerned with the policies of the American leadership in conducting the wars, as well as the conditions of the soldiers serving.  Hackworth continued the column until his death from bladder cancer in May 2005. Associates believe that his cancer was caused by exposure to Agent Blue (a defoliant used in Vietnam), and are lobbying the United States government to have the substance labeled a known carcinogen like the more famous Agent Orange.

Hackworth died on May 4, 2005, at the age of 74 in Tijuana, Mexico, as he was searching for alternative treatments for his bladder cancer. He was survived by his wife, Eilhys England, four children from his two previous marriages, and a stepdaughter. His remains were interred at Arlington National Cemetery.

Military decorations and awards
Hackworth earned over 90 U.S. and foreign military awards and frequently wore a CIB lapel pin on his civilian sport jackets.

His military awards include:

Distinguished Service Cross citations

Ranger tab issue
In response to Hackworth's investigation of Admiral Boorda, CNN and the CBS Evening News with Dan Rather questioned the accuracy of Hackworth's own military decorations. In particular, the reports accused Hackworth of claiming a Ranger Tab to which he was not entitled and an extra Distinguished Flying Cross listed on his website. Hackworth threatened to sue CBS and requested a formal audit of his military records. In response to the military audit, the executive producer of CBS News sent a letter to Hackworth that stated:

In 2002, Hackworth was asked about the controversy in an interview with Proceedings. In the interview, he stated:

Works

Books
 About Face: The Odyssey of an American Warrior
 Steel My Soldiers' Hearts
 Hazardous Duty
 Price of Honor
 Brave Men
 The Vietnam Primer (with General S. L. A. "Slam" Marshall)

Journalism – Hackworth wrote articles for:
 Maxim
 Men's Journal
 Modern Maturity
 Newsweek
 Parade
 People
 Playboy
 Self
 Soldier of Fortune
 WorldNetDaily

Hackworth was also a founder of Soldiers for the Truth, an advocacy group focused on military reform, both in terms of capability and treatment of personnel.

In addition, on his deathbed in 2005, Hackworth asked his wife Eilhys to “carry on the crusade to help the soldiers who suffer most from silent trauma.” Stand for the Troops is a living legacy for his devotion to the military and the men and women who both served and continue to serve.

References

Sources

External links

 Stand for the Troops
 
 Review of 'About Face' in US Army War College Parameters magazine, December, 1989
 Slate article, Newsweek's Major Embarrassment: He's called Col. Hackworth, November, 1996
 Inspector General Military Assistance Command Vietnam – Report of Investigation of Colonel David Hackworth, 16 January 1971

1930 births
2005 deaths
American male journalists
20th-century American journalists
United States Army personnel of the Korean War
United States Army personnel of the Vietnam War
American sailors
Burials at Arlington National Cemetery
Deaths from cancer in Mexico
American military historians
Recipients of the Distinguished Service Cross (United States)
Recipients of the Silver Star
Recipients of the Legion of Merit
Recipients of the Distinguished Flying Cross (United States)
Recipients of the Air Medal
Recipients of the Gallantry Cross (Vietnam)
Recipients of the Distinguished Service Order (Vietnam)
United States Army colonels
Deaths from bladder cancer
Los Angeles Harbor College alumni
Austin Peay State University alumni
United States Army Command and General Staff College alumni